The Cheraw were a Siouxan-speaking Native American people of North and South Carolina.

Cheraw may also refer to:
 Cheraw, Colorado
 Cheraw, Mississippi
 Cheraw, South Carolina
 Cheraw (YTB-802), a United States Navy Natick-class large harbor tug